The River Thames whale, affectionately nicknamed Willy by Londoners, was a juvenile female northern bottlenose whale which was discovered swimming in the River Thames in central London on Friday 20 January 2006. According to the BBC, she was five metres (16-18ft) long and weighed about twelve tonnes (24,400 lb). The whale appeared to have been lost, as her normal habitat would have been around the coasts of the far north of Scotland and Northern Ireland, and in the seas around the Arctic Ocean. It was the first time the species had been seen in the Thames since records began in 1913. She died from convulsions as she was being rescued shortly after 19:00 GMT on 21 January 2006.

History

19 January
On Thursday 19 January reports from the Thames Barrier control team were made to the British Divers Marine Life Rescue (BDMLR) that one, or possibly two, pilot whales had come through the barrier. This turned out to be the bottlenose whale, and BDMLR commenced monitoring the whale that evening.

20 January

At 8:30 am on Friday 20 January, David Dopin was on a train when he phoned the authorities to say that he believed he had been hallucinating, as he thought he had just spotted a whale swimming in the River Thames. Throughout the morning, more and more whale sightings were reported, confirmed when television cameras captured the bottlenose whale on video.

The whale beached several times during the day as the tide went out. Members of the public went onto the foreshore to encourage the whale back into deeper water. Blood was also visible.

As night approached, there were signs that the whale may have been swimming with the current out of London towards the sea: an unconfirmed sighting by a BBC cameraman at 9:00 pm placed the whale in Greenwich. The area was searched but nothing was found. There were no further official sightings until 1:10 am the following morning in Battersea, after the tide had changed. The whale was monitored until 3:30 am, when Jamie Henn, a Marine Mammal Medic working for BDMLR finally called the monitoring off as the whale would not strand at high tide.

21 January

At 7:30 am the next morning BDMLR members, along with Port Authority officials, started observing the whale again. It was decided that the BDMLR would have to assist the whale as she was not strong enough to swim out of the Thames by herself, and had been losing ground against the tide.

There was fear later in the day that the whale could have perished, as she had not been seen for some time; however, she was spotted by a Port Authority boat at 9:26 am near Albert Bridge. The BDMLR decided it was time to act. With significant help from the Port of London Authority and the Metropolitan Police BDMLR medics decided to deliberately beach the whale at low tide on a sandbank, and then move her out of the Thames. At midday they captured the whale, covered her eyes to prevent her from panicking, and made a medical examination.

After two hours, the whale was slowly and gently lifted onto a barge by a crane near Albert Bridge. By this stage there were thousands of people watching the situation develop from the banks of the river, and the images were seen across the world. The excitement of the previous day had disappeared, and there was now serious concern that the whale would be unable to survive for much longer. As the barge rushed along the Thames towards the sea, news channels provided non-stop coverage of the journey. It reached the Thames Barrier at approximately 5:00 pm. Later, despite the darkness, it was reported that crowds were lining the Queen Elizabeth II Bridge to catch a glimpse of the barge.

As each hour passed, there was growing concern for the whale's health, and she was said to be taking a turn for the worse due to being out of the water, as well as slowly being crushed by her own body weight. Plans to release the whale into the Atlantic ocean were shelved (the rescue team having previously put out a public appeal for a suitable boat); instead she was to be released off the Kent coast near Margate at Shivering Sands. All this time, the BDMLR were saying the final decision would be taken by a vet on board, who would decide whether to release or euthanise the whale. Later the mammal was described as being "distressed", breathing heavily and developing muscle problems. At 7:08 pm on 21 January it was confirmed the whale had died after suffering from convulsions.

Post mortem
A team led by veterinarian Paul Jepson carried out an immediate necropsy on the whale on behalf of the Zoological Society of London.  The whale's body had several gashes along its underbelly, head and dorsal fin, most likely caused by collisions with boats and rubbing against the rocky river bed.  It was confirmed that the whale was a female juvenile. The results, announced on 25 January 2006, showed that she had died from a combination of problems including dehydration, muscle damage and kidney failure.

Reasons for entry

The reasons for the whale's presence in the Thames were unclear. A number of possible causes were raised prior to the post-mortem:

 Illness: some previous whale strandings are believed to have been caused by physical ill-health, resulting from factors such as parasite infections or pollution, which can disorient whales and cause them to strand themselves in shallow water.
 Noise pollution: there have been a number of incidents in which military sonar systems have caused hearing damage to marine mammals. It was suggested that Royal Navy sonar testing may have been a factor; however, the post-mortem revealed no damage to the whale's auditory functions.
 A food hunt: it was suggested that the whale may have been chasing a shoal of fish up the Thames. However, the principal food source for the northern bottlenose whale is squid, not fish.
 A navigational error: according to the scientists who conducted the post-mortem, the most likely explanation for the incident was simply that the whale was seeking to return to its normal feeding grounds in the North Atlantic and took a wrong turn, mistakenly swimming west up the Thames rather than taking the longer route around the coast.

Events after the whale's death
It was initially thought that the whale's body might be buried in a landfill, or incinerated if it presented a health hazard. After a campaign by The Sun newspaper to raise the £10,000 necessary for the recovery of the whale's skeleton, it was announced on 23 January that the bones of the mammal were to be given to the Natural History Museum with the intention that they be used for scientific research. Due to infrequent strandings of the species, it was the first complete northern bottlenose whale skeleton to enter the UK's national collection of marine mammal skeletons for more than 20 years. The skeleton was put on public display at the end of January 2007 at The Guardian and Observer Archive and Visitor Centre.

In 2006, the BDMLR placed for auction on eBay the small red watering can used during the attempt to keep the body of the whale wet on its journey down the Thames. The can was autographed by the rescue team. Following a 10-day auction attracting 50 genuine bids a total of £2,050 was raised. The auction was marred by dozens of spoof bids, several exceeding £1 million.

Damon Albarn wrote a song called "Northern Whale", which was recorded by his alternative rock band The Good, the Bad & the Queen for their album The Good, the Bad & the Queen. At their BBC Electric Proms concert (26 October 2006), Albarn introduced the song by saying: "This next song started off as a love song, for someone I love. And then a whale came up the Thames... And it turned into a song about a whale."

On 21 December 2006 Channel 4 screened The Whale That Swam To London, a 60-minute documentary about the events of January 2006.

Other whales
Throughout the two days that the whale was in the Thames waters, there were unconfirmed sightings of a second whale near the Thames Barrier and in Southend-on-Sea. On 21 January, whale song was reported around the Thames Estuary. The body of a small marine mammal - later confirmed as a porpoise - was discovered upstream at Putney the same day. There is no indication that this incident had any connection with that of the Thames whale. There had been reports of a harbour porpoise (Phocoena phocoena) in the Thames near Chiswick and Kew on the Tuesday and Wednesday prior to the Thames whale. BDMLR medics did several watches to no avail; the body of this porpoise washed up nearby on the same day as the whale rescue.

In early February, a sperm whale (Physeter macrocephalus) stranded itself in the Humber Estuary and died shortly afterwards. On 15 February 2006, a young adult male sperm whale was washed ashore in Skegness, Lincolnshire. Paul Jepson from the Zoological Society of London performed an autopsy. On 14 September 2009, a young humpback whale was washed ashore in the Thames at Dartford, Kent. It is thought to have died from starvation.

On 25 September 2018, a beluga whale (Delphinapterus leucas) was sighted travelling inland in the Thames estuary and was initially described as 'in trouble' due to him being on his own - belugas are a social species, and a solitary individual is considered unusual - and far from his species’ normal range. He was nicknamed 'Benny' by several news outlets, and was sighted again the following day near Gravesend, Kent. Benny remained in the Thames Estuary for several months, and is believed to have travelled back out to sea during early 2019.

On May 9, 2021, a common minke whale (Balaenoptera acutorostrata) was spotted in the Thames near Richmond Lock. It had become stuck on the lock's boat rollers and had to be freed from members of the Port of London Authority (PLA), Royal National Lifeboat Institution (RNLI) and the British Divers Marine Life Rescue service. It was later put down.

See also

 Tama-chan, an Arctic bearded seal in the Tokyo area, which became a national celebrity in 2002
 Humphrey the Whale, which suffered a similar ordeal after accidentally entering San Francisco Bay, but survived
 List of individual cetaceans

References

External links

"The Official Thames Whale web site" (BDMLR)
"Revived river boasts seals, sea horses and one piranha" (The Independent)
"London whale dies a lonely death" (The Observer)
"How early hope turned to despair at dusk" (The Observer)
"A whale which touched London" (The Observer leader)
"The whale they couldn't save" (Sunday Times)
"London's whale history: We weren’t always quite so sentimental" (Sunday Times)
"London Whale Rescue Photos from the Thames bank" (blog)
"Lewis PR Whale Watch" (blog)
"Matt cartoon" (Daily Telegraph)
"Navy denies killing Thames whale" (The Times)
"Whale may live on — as a museum attraction" (The Times)
Offcourse News Special Selection of topical stories from the day a whale wandered into the Thames

2006 animal deaths
Wayward cetaceans
2006 in London
Whale
1995 animal births
Individual wild animals